Lost in the Fifties Tonight is the seventeenth studio album by American country music artist Ronnie Milsap, released in 1986. The album produced four singles, all of which claimed the top spot on the Billboard country singles chart, including the title track, which was previously featured on Milsap's Second Greatest Hits Volume. The others included "Happy, Happy Birthday Baby",  "In Love" and "How Do I Turn You On."

The album reached No. 1 on Country charts and peaked at #121 on the Billboard 200. It was ultimately certified as gold. The album went out of print in 2005, but was re-released as a double album with 1987's Heart & Soul on May 8, 2012.

Track listing

Personnel
As listed in liner notes.
Brandon Barnes – synthesizer
Robert Byrne – background vocals
Larry Byrom – electric guitar
Jimmy Capps – acoustic guitar
Bruce Dees – electric guitar, background vocals
Sonny Garrish – steel guitar
Jon Goin – electric guitar, acoustic guitar
Jim Horn – saxophone
Mitch Humphries – keyboards
Shane Keister – keyboards, synthesizer, drum programming
Mike Lawler – synthesizer
Larrie Londin – drums
Ronnie Milsap – lead vocals, background vocals, keyboards
Farrell Morris – percussion
Lisa Silver – background vocals
Jay Spell – keyboards
Suzy Storm – background vocals
Diane Tidwell – background vocals
Marie Tomlinson – background vocals
Bergen White – background vocals
Dennis Wilson – background vocals
Bob Wray – bass guitar
Barbara Wyrick – background vocals
Roy Yeager – drums
Strings performed by the Nashville String Machine, arranged by Bergen White and conducted by Carlos Gorodetzky.

Charts

Weekly charts

Year-end charts

Singles

References

1986 albums
Ronnie Milsap albums
RCA Records albums
Albums produced by Tom Collins (record producer)